Divine Infekt is Psyclon Nine's first studio album, released on September 15, 2003 by NoiTekk.

Track listing
All songs were written by Ner0.
 "Divine Infekt" – 4:01
 "Tyranny" - 4:35
 "Clinik" - 4:01
 "Slaughter" - 3:41
 "Resurrekt" - 4:31
 "Payback" - 2:59
 "Genocide" - 3:50
 "Rusted" - 3:39
 "So Be It" - 4:40
 "As You Sleep" - 3:46
 "Divine Infekt (Tactical Sekt UN version)" – 5:13

Personnel

Psyclon Nine

 Nero Bellum - Vocals, Synthesizer, Programming
 Eric Gottesman - Live Synth
 Josef Heresy - Live Synth

Production

 Nero Bellum - Co-Producer
 Concept by Eric Gottesman and Nero Bellum
 Produced and mastered by Da5id Din

References

Psyclon Nine albums
2003 debut albums